Navayana (Devanagari: नवयान, IAST: Navayāna) means "new vehicle" and refers to the re-interpretation of Buddhism by Bhimrao Ramji Ambedkar; it is also called Neo-Buddhism and Ambedkarite Buddhism. Ambedkar was a polymath, theologian and scholar of Buddhism. He was born in a Dalit (untouchable) family during the colonial era of India, studied abroad, became a Dalit leader, and announced in 1935 his intent to convert from Hinduism to a different religion, and he has studied all the major religions of the world in depth, including Hinduism, Islam, Christianity, Sikhism, and Buddhism, for nearly 21 years. Thereafter Ambedkar studied texts of Buddhism, found several of its core beliefs and doctrines such as Four Noble Truths and "non-self" as flawed and pessimistic, then re-interpreted these into what he called "new vehicle" Buddhism, or Navayana. Ambedkar held a press conference on 13 October 1956, announcing his rejection of Theravada and Mahayana Buddhism, as well as of Hinduism. Thereafter, he left Hinduism and adopted Navayana, about six weeks before his death. Its adherents see Navayana Buddhism not as a sect with radically different ideas, but rather as new movement founded on the principles of Buddhism.

In the Dalit Buddhist movement of India, Navayana is considered a new branch of Buddhism, different from the traditionally recognized branches of Theravada, Mahayana, and Vajrayana – considered to be foundational in the Buddhist traditions. It partially but radically re-interprets what Buddhism is, revising parts of the original Buddha teaching to be  more concerned with class struggle and social equality taking into account modern problems.

Almost 90% of Navayana live in Maharashtra. In the 2011 census, Marathi Buddhists were 6.5 million, constituting 5.8% of the population of Maharashtra and 77% of the Buddhist population of India.

Ambedkar called his version of Buddhism Navayana or "Neo-Buddhism". His book, The Buddha and His Dhamma is the holy book of Navayana followers. Followers of Navayana Buddhism are generally called "Buddhists" (Baud'dha) as well as Ambedkarite Buddhists, Neo-Buddhists, and rarely Navayana Buddhists.

While the term Navayana is most commonly used in reference to the movement Ambedkar founded in India, it is also (more rarely) used in a different sense, to refer to Westernised forms of Buddhism.

Origins 

Ambedkar was an Indian leader influential during the colonial era and the early post-independence period of India. He was the fourteenth child in an impoverished Maharashtra Schedule caste family, who studied abroad, returned to India in the 1920s and joined the political movement. His focus was social and political rights for the Depressed class community. To free his community from religious prejudice, he concluded that they must leave Hinduism and convert to a different religion. He chose Buddhism in the form of Navayana.

Doctrines and concepts 
In 1935, during his disagreements with Mahatma Gandhi, Ambedkar announced his intent to convert from Hinduism to Buddhism. Over the next two decades, Ambedkar studied Buddhist texts and wrote The Buddha and His Dhamma which is the primary doctrine of those who follow Navayana Buddhism.

Ambedkar's 22 vows

Commencement 

Ambedkar re-interpreted Buddhism to address such issues in his mind, and re-formulated the traditional teachings of Buddhism into a "new vehicle" called Navayana. Navayana dhamma doctrine as propounded by Ambedkar, states Sumant (2004), "does not situate morality in a transcendental [religious] domain", nor in "a civil association, including the state". Dhamma is derived from and the guiding principle for social conscience.

Navayana Buddhism began in 1956, when Bhimrao R. Ambedkar adopted it, and 380,000 Dalit community members converted to Navayana from Hinduism on 14 and 15 October 1956. After that on every year 14 October is celebrated as Dhammachakra Pravartan Day at Dikshabhoomi, Nagpur:

Scripture and practice 
The writings of Dr.B.R. Ambedkar were posthumously published as The Buddha and His Dhamma, and this is the scripture for those who follow Navayana Buddhism. Among Navayana followers, state Keown & Prebish (2013), this is "often referred to as their 'bible' and its novel interpretation of the Buddhist path commonly constitutes their only source of knowledge on the subject".

Dr.B.R. Ambedkar is regarded as a bodhisattva, the Maitreya, among the Navayana followers. In practice, the Navayana followers revere Ambedkar, states Deitrick (2013), as virtually on-par with the Buddha. He is considered as the one prophesied to appear and teach the dhamma after it was forgotten; his iconography is a part of Navayana shrines and he is shown with a halo. Though Ambedkar states Navayana to be atheist, Navayana viharas and shrines features images of the Buddha and Ambedkar, and the followers bow and offer prayers before them in practice. According to Junghare (1988), for the followers of Navayana, Ambedkar has become a deity and is devotionally worshipped.

Reception 

Ambedkar's re-interpretation of Buddhism and his formulation of Navayana has attracted admirers and criticism. The Navayana theories restate the core doctrines of Buddhism, according to Zelliot & Macy (1980), wherein Ambedkar's "social emphasis exclude[s] or distort some teaching, fundamental to traditional and canonical Buddhism". Anne Blackburn states that Ambedkar re‑interprets core concepts of Buddhism in class conflict terms, where nirvana is not the aim and end of spiritual pursuits, but a preparation for social action against inequality:

Nibbana (Skt. nirvana) the state or process which describes enlightenment, is considered [by Ambedkar] a precursor for moral action in the world and explicitly associated with a non-monastic lifestyle. Nibbana "means enough control over passion so as to enable one to walk on the path of righteousness". Ambedkar's interpretation of dukkha and nibbana implies that moral action, for which nibbana is preparation, will rectify the material suffering of inequality.

Ambedkar considered all ideas in Theravada and Mahayana Buddhism that relate to an individual's merit and spiritual development as insertions into Buddhism, and something that "cannot be accepted to be the word of the Buddha". Buddhism, to Ambedkar, must have been a social reform movement. Martin Fuchs states that Ambedkar's effort is to be admired as an attempt to seek a "post-religious religion" which transcends distinctions and as being driven by the "reasonable principle of sociality", not in the sense of spiritual doctrines, philosophical speculations and existentialist questions.

According to Blackburn, "neither view of traditional Buddhism — as a social reform movement or as some other stable entity interpreted (or misinterpreted) from a social reform perspective — is historically accurate", thereby placing Navayana theories to be a‑historical, though it served as an important means to Dalit political mobilization and social movement.

Scholars broadly accept that the depictions of the Buddha as a social reformer are inaccurate. Gombrich (2012), states that there is no evidence that the Buddha began or pursued social reforms, rather his aim was at the salvation of those who joined his monastic order. Modernist interpreters of Buddhism, states Gombrich, keep picking up this "mistake from western authors", a view that initially came into vogue during the colonial era. Empirical evidence outside of India, such as in the Theravada Buddhist monasteries of the Sinhalese society, suggests that class ideas have been prevalent among the sangha monks, and between the Buddhist monks and the laity. In all canonical Buddhist texts, the khattiyas (warrior class) are always mentioned first and never other classes such as brahmans, vessas, suddas.

The novel interpretations and the dismissal of mainstream doctrines of Buddhism by Ambedkar as he formulated Navayana has led some to suggest that Navayana may more properly be called Ambedkarism. However, Ambedkar did not consider himself as the originator of a new Buddhism, but stated that he was merely reviving what was original Buddhism after centuries of "misguided interpretation" by wrong headed Buddhist monks. Others, states Skaria, consider Ambedkar attempting a synthesis of the ideas of modern Karl Marx into the structure of ideas by the ancient Buddha, as Ambedkar worked on essays on both in the final years of his life.

According to Janet Contursi, Ambedkar re-interprets Buddhist religion and with Navayana "speaks through Gautama and politicizes the Buddha philosophy as he theologizes his own political views".

Status in India 

According to the 2011 Census of India there are 8.4 million Buddhists in India. Navayana Buddhists comprise about 87% (7.3 million) of Indian Buddhist community, and nearly 90% (6.5 million) of all Navayana Buddhists in India live in Maharashtra state. A 2017 IndiaSpend.com report on census data says "Buddhists have a literacy rate of 81.29%, higher than the national average of 72.98%", but it does not distinguish Navayana Buddhists from other Buddhists. When compared to overall literacy rate of Maharashtra state where 80% of Buddhists are found, their literacy rate is 83.17% or slightly higher than statewide average of 82.34%.

According to Jean Darian, the conversion to Buddhism and its growth in India has in part been because of non-religious factors, in particular the political and economic needs of the community as well as the needs of the political leaders and the expanding administrative structure in India. According to Trevor Ling and Steven Axelrod, the intellectual and political side of Navayana Buddhist movement lost traction after the death of Ambedkar.

Festivals
Major festivals among Navayana Buddhists are:
 Ambedkar Jayanti
 Dhammachakra Pravartan Day 
 Buddha's Birthday

See also 

 Buddhism in India
 Buddhist modernism
 Buddhist socialism
 Engaged Buddhism
 Humanistic Buddhism
 Marathi Buddhists

Footnotes

References

Further reading

External links 
 
 

 
B. R. Ambedkar
Buddhism in Maharashtra
Buddhist new religious movements
Dalit
Indian Buddhists